Muhammad Al-Sa'id Abdallah Abouhalima (also Mohamed Abouhalima, ; born November 19, 1993, in Alexandria) is an Egyptian amateur Greco-Roman wrestler, who competes in the men's featherweight category. Abouhalima represented Egypt at the 2012 Summer Olympics in London, where he competed in the 55 kg class. He lost the qualifying match to U.S. wrestler Spenser Mango, who was able to score six points in two straight periods, leaving Abouhalima with a single point.

References

External links
Profile – International Wrestling Database
NBC Olympics Profile

1993 births
Living people
Egyptian male sport wrestlers
Olympic wrestlers of Egypt
Wrestlers at the 2012 Summer Olympics
Sportspeople from Alexandria
African Wrestling Championships medalists
20th-century Egyptian people
21st-century Egyptian people